Nam Nguyen (born May 20, 1998) is a Canadian retired competitive figure skater. He is the 2014 World Junior champion, 2019 Skate Canada silver medallist, and two-time Canadian national champion (2015, 2019). He has placed as high as fifth at the World Championships, in 2015.

Personal life
Nam Nguyen was born May 20, 1998 in Ottawa. Both of his parents are from Vietnam — his father, Sony, moved to Canada in 1988 and sponsored his wife, Thu, in 1994. His father is an engineer and his mother works for a medical software company. His sister, Kim, is six years younger and is also a figure skater. He lived in Richmond, British Columbia and Burnaby, B.C. from 1999 to 2012, and then moved to Toronto, Ontario, so that he and his sister could train under Brian Orser.

Nguyen studied health sciences at York University.

Career
Nguyen began skating in 2003. Growing up, his figure skating idols were Evgeni Plushenko, Stephane Lambiel, and Jeffrey Buttle. Nguyen also cited his former training mates, Yuzuru Hanyu and Javier Fernandez, as being his inspirations.

Early career
From 2007 to 2009, Nguyen won three Canadian national men's titles — Juvenile, Pre-Novice, and Novice — each time becoming the youngest skater to do so. In 2010, he won the bronze medal on the junior level at the Canadian Championships. Nguyen performed in the exhibition gala at the 2010 Winter Olympics in Vancouver, British Columbia. The following year at the 2011 Canadian Championships, he became the youngest skater to win the junior men's title.

2011–2012 season
In the 2011–2012 season, Nguyen became age-eligible for international junior competition. He finished twelfth in his first Junior Grand Prix (JGP) event in Riga, Latvia and then won the bronze medal in his second event in Brasov, Romania. He placed seventh on the senior level at the 2012 Canadian Championships and was assigned to the 2012 World Junior Championships. Nguyen landed his first triple axel in competition in the preliminary round and qualified for the short program with a first-place finish. He was eighteenth in the short program and eleventh in the free skating, finishing thirteenth overall at the event. Joanne McLeod coached him at the BC Centre of Excellence in Burnaby, British Columbia until the end of the season.

2012–2013 season
In the summer of 2012, Nguyen moved to Toronto to work with Brian Orser at the Toronto Cricket, Skating and Curling Club. He started the season at the JGP in France where he finished ninth. He did better at his second JGP event, in Turkey, earning the bronze medal. At the Canadian Championships, he placed sixth in the senior division. He finished the season at the World Junior Championships in Milan, Italy, where he placed twelfth.

2013–2014 season
The next season, he placed fourth and 16th at his two JGP events. Competing at the senior level, he placed fifth at the Canadian Championships. He then competed at his first senior international, the Four Continents Championships, and placed tenth. Afterwards, at the World Junior Championships in Sofia, Bulgaria, he placed first in both segments and won the gold medal. He finished the season at the senior World Championships, where he placed twelfth.

2014–2015 season
Nguyen started the season with a silver medal at the inaugural Skate Canada Autumn Classic, an ISU Challenger Series event. He made his senior Grand Prix debut at the Skate America, winning the bronze medal. He continued to his second Grand Prix event, the Cup of China, where he placed fourth. This placed him ninth in the final Grand Prix standings, making him third alternate for the final. In December, he won the gold medal at the Skate Canada Challenge, the qualifying event for Canadian Nationals. In January, he won his first senior national title, outscoring the silver medallist by more than 30 points. After placing eleventh at the 2015 Four Continents, he finished fifth at the 2015 World Championships in Shanghai, recording his personal best scores in both segments.

2015–2016 season
Nguyen started his season by winning silver at the 2015 Skate Canada Autumn Classic. Turning to the Grand Prix series, he placed fifth at the 2015 Skate Canada International and seventh at 2015 Rostelecom Cup.

Nguyen finished fourth at the 2016 Canadian Nationals. He was assigned to the 2016 World Championships in Boston after Liam Firus withdrew. He failed to qualify to the free skating. In an interview at the 2016 Team Challenge Cup, he mentioned his planned coaching change to David Glynn. Skate Canada confirmed the change a few days later, stating that Nguyen would move to San Jose in May.

2016–2017 season
Nguyen placed fifth at the 2016 CS U.S. International Classic. On the Grand Prix series, he placed sixth at the 2016 Skate America and eighth at the 2016 NHK Trophy.

After returning to Ontario in December 2016, he began training at the York Region Skating Academy, coached by Tracey Wainman and Grzegorz Filipowski. He won the bronze medal at the 2017 Canadian Championships and placed 8th at the 2017 Four Continents Championships. Nguyen switched coaches again following continued disappointing results, working instead with Robert Burke in Richmond Hill.

2017–2018 season
Nguyen placed fifth at the 2017 CS Autumn Classic and seventh at the 2017 Rostelecom Cup. At the 2017 NHK Trophy in Osaka, Japan, Nam placed tenth overall after disappointing eleventh place in short program. Later in Montreal, Nguyen took the bronze medal at the 2018 Skate Canada Challenge.

Nguyen placed third at the 2018 Canadian Championships, behind Patrick Chan and Keegan Messing, and thus was not picked for the Canadian delegation to the 2018 Winter Olympics.  He instead joined Messing on the Canadian team at the 2018 World Championships, where he had a poor showing in the short program and failed to qualify for the free skating.

2018–2019 season
Nguyen opened the new season at the 2018 U.S. Classic, where he placed first in the short program and second in the free skate to win the gold medal, his first international gold at the senior level. He was assigned to two ISU Grand Prix events, Skate America, where he placed sixth, and Skate Canada, where he placed fifth.

In January 2019, Nguyen competed at the 2019 Canadian Championships.  He placed third in the short program after doubling the second part of his combination.  He then won the free skate, and the overall title, the second of his career. He was subsequently named to the Canadian teams for the Four Continents and World Championships.

At the 2019 World Championships, Nguyen placed sixteenth after two error-riddled programs. The placements of Nguyen and Messing meant that Canada would have only one men's berth at the 2020 World Championships.  Nguyen concluded the season at the 2019 World Team Trophy, where he placed seventh overall among the twelve men.

2019–2020 season 
Nguyen placed fourth at the 2019 Nebelhorn Trophy, finishing ninth in the short program after making severe errors on all his jumping passes and second in the free program after only one fall.

Beginning the Grand Prix at the 2019 Skate Canada International, Nguyen was third in the short program behind Yuzuru Hanyu and Camden Pulkinen with a mostly clean skate, but for a minor error on his triple flip. Nguyen performed last in the free skate, immediately after a near-world record performance by Hanyu.  He skated with only one minor error, singling a planned double toe loop, and set new personal bests in both the free skate and total score to take the silver medal, his first Grand Prix medal in five years.  Nguyen was fifth at his second assignment, the 2019 Rostelecom Cup, his only major error being popping one of his planned quad Salchow jumps in the free skate.

Nguyen set out to defend his national title at the 2020 Canadian Championships, placing second in the short program behind Messing. Nguyen fell on both of his quad Salchow attempts in the free skate, and remained in second place overall, behind Roman Sadovsky.  Skate Canada declined to determine who would take the sole men's berth at the World Championships in Montreal, and assigned the entire men's podium to compete at the 2020 Four Continents Championships in Seoul.  Nguyen placed sixth at Four Continents, the highest placement among the Canadian men there, with his only error across two programs being a singled attempt at a triple Axel in the free skate.

Due to his strong performance at Four Continents, Nguyen was chosen to represent Canada at the World Championships, but these were cancelled as a result of the coronavirus pandemic.

2020–2021 season 
Nguyen was assigned to compete at the 2020 Skate Canada International, but the event was cancelled as a result of the pandemic.

With the pandemic continuing to make it difficult to hold in-person events, Skate Canada held the 2021 Skate Canada Challenge virtually. Nguyen won the silver medal, finishing 5.58 points behind Roman Sadovsky.  Nguyen was named as an alternate to the 2021 World Championships, the lone men's berth going to Keegan Messing. With Canada's mandatory two-week quarantine for returning athletes, however, no member of the World team was assigned to the 2021 World Team Trophy, and Nguyen was assigned as one of Canada's two men's entries, alongside Sadovsky. On April 8, he was named as team captain.  Nguyen placed eleventh of eleven skaters in both segments of the competition, while Team Canada finished in sixth place.

2021–2022 season 
Nguyen was initially assigned to compete at the 2021 CS Autumn Classic International, but withdrew shortly before the competition. He subsequently made his competitive debut at the 2021 Skate America, where he placed eighth. He was tenth at his second Grand Prix, the 2021 NHK Trophy. He landed a quad Salchow in the free skate, and said afterward that his overall score was "a reflection of how I've been focusing on my training. I recently just got my quad a few weeks ago and I’ve been neglecting the connection between the elements."

Nguyen contracted COVID-19 the week before the 2022 Canadian Championships, the last event prior to the selection of the Canadian Olympic team. He was off the ice for five days, returning to the ice four days before the short program. He struggled at the competition, finishing in sixth place, and was not named to the team. Nguyen had earlier said he anticipated this being his final season, but after the championships said that he "wanted to finish on a really high note, however, I did say earlier this season that this could be my last season. However, I was in a different mindset back then and a lot has happened from then to now, so I am not quite sure yet what my future holds." Nguyen subsequently announced on May 20 that he would be retiring as he had originally planned. He said that "after nationals, I was very, very determined to do another season, and we were already in the kind of like planning mode. And then give or take a few weeks, maybe a couple of months, my feeling shifted a lot."

Post-competitive career
Interviewed in September 2022, Nguyen stated, "[Watching figure skating] just pushed me away further because I remembered how awful I felt during my warm-up and how nervous I felt, and sitting there in front of the TV, I'm like, 'I'm so glad I'm not doing this anymore.'" Having no desire to work as a figure skating coach, he decided to coach ice hockey players in power skating.

Programs

Competitive highlights
 GP: Grand Prix; CS: Challenger Series; JGP: Junior Grand Prix

2011–12 to present

2006–07 to 2010–11

Detailed results
Small medals for short program and free skating awarded only at ISU Championships.

Senior

Junior

  Juvenile skaters have only one program (free skating).
  Competition dates, not event dates.
 JGP = Junior Grand Prix

References

External links

 

1998 births
Canadian male single skaters
Canadian people of Vietnamese descent
Living people
Sportspeople from Ottawa
Sportspeople of Vietnamese descent
World Junior Figure Skating Championships medalists